Melica bocquetii, is a species of grass in the family Poaceae that is endemic to the Subbaetic mountains of southern Spain.

Description
The species is perennial and caespitose with elongated rhizomes. Culm-internodes scaberulous with leaf-sheaths are scabrous and tubular with one of their length being closed. They also have scaberulous surface which is also puberulous and hairy as well. Fertile spikelets have hairy, pubescent, curved and filiformed pedicels. Florets are diminished with callus being pubescent as well. The species have a smooth rachilla.

Sterile floret is also barren, cuneate, and is clumped. Both the lower and upper glumes are keelless, lanceolate, and have attenuate apexes, but have different surfaces. Fruits are fusiform and have an additional pericarp.

References

External links
Image
Image on Flickr

bocquetii
Flora of Europe